Mehmet Terzi (born May 5, 1955) is a medal-winning former long-distance runner from Turkey, who specialized in running marathons. He served as the president of the Turkish Athletic Federation (TAF) for nine years between 2004 and 2013.

Terzi was born on May 5, 1955 at Kurtköy in Bilecik Province, mid-western Turkey. He competed in 1500m, 5000m, 10000m and cross-country in various clubs in Eskişehir, Mersin, Ankara, Bursa, Zonguldak and Istanbul after entering athletics in 1970 in Eskişehir. He was member of Fenerbahçe SK.

Mehmet Terzi won a bronze medal at the 1979 Mediterranean Games in Split, Yugoslavia; and clinched the marathon gold medal at the 1983 Mediterranean Games in Casablanca, Morocco. He also won the Istanbul Marathon in 1985 and the San Francisco Marathon in 1987; after receiving silver medals in the 1978 Paris, France and 1983 Frankfurt, Germany marathons.

He competed for Turkey in marathon at the 1984 Los Angeles and 1988 Seoul Olympics, but did not achieve a top rank.

In 2004, Mehmet Terzi was elected president of the Turkish Athletic Federation for a term of four years. He was re-elected for the same post for another four-year term in 2008. He won his third consecutive election in 2012, but was forced to resign after a high-profile doping scandal in Turkish athletics during the summer of 2013. Terzi resigned from the TAF Presidency on 1 August 2013, just before the World Championships in Moscow.

References

External links 
 
 
 

1955 births
Living people
Olympic athletes of Turkey
Athletes (track and field) at the 1984 Summer Olympics
Athletes (track and field) at the 1988 Summer Olympics
Turkish male long-distance runners
Turkish male marathon runners
Fenerbahçe athletes
Turkish referees and umpires
People from Kurtköy, Bilecik
World Athletics Championships athletes for Turkey
Mediterranean Games gold medalists for Turkey
Mediterranean Games bronze medalists for Turkey
Athletes (track and field) at the 1979 Mediterranean Games
Athletes (track and field) at the 1983 Mediterranean Games
Mediterranean Games medalists in athletics